Katy Kung (born 5 December 1989) is a Hong Kong actress under the contract of TVB.

Career 
Katy Kung's career began at the age of 16, when she became a model for a magazine introduced to her by a friend. She later worked as a television presenter for two years at i-Cable before signing with TVB in 2008. 

In 2016, Kung gained recognition with her performance in the drama Two Steps From Heaven, winning the Best Supporting Actress award at the 2016 TVB Anniversary Awards.

In 2020, Kung received attention and garnered praise from netizens for her performances in the dramas Death By Zero and Hong Kong Love Stories, eventually winning the Favourite TVB Actress in Malaysia and Most Popular Female Character awards at the 2020 TVB Anniversary Awards.

Personal life 
In November 2012, Kung hinted a breakup via Weibo with her boyfriend, Patrick Tang, whom she met in 2010 on the set of 7 Days in Life. Later in an interview, she admitted a breakup some time ago but did not specify the time.

Kung became good friends with co-actresses Grace Chan, Zoie Tam and Jessie Sum when filming the drama The Forgotten Valley.

Filmography

Television dramas

Films

References

External links 
 Katy Kung at TVB
 
 
 
 Katy Kung on Tencent Weibo

1989 births
Living people
21st-century Hong Kong actresses
Hong Kong film actresses
Hong Kong television presenters
Hong Kong women television presenters
Hong Kong television actresses
Hong Kong female models
TVB actors
Alumni of The Hong Kong Academy for Performing Arts